Ante Nazor (born 30 November 1978) is a Croatian professional basketball coach.

Coaching career
Nazor started his coaching career in his early twenties as coach of the Split youth teams.

He spent two Olympic cycles coaching the Croatia men's national basketball team youth selections; first as assistant coach to Vlado Vanjak at the 2008 FIBA Europe Under-18 Championship earning the bronze medal, after which he assisted Boro Kurtović at the 2009 FIBA Under-19 World Championship earning the bronze medal again. Next year he became head coach and continued winning medals: gold at the 2011 FIBA Europe Under-16 Championship, bronze at the 2012 FIBA Under-17 World Championship, silver at the 2013 FIBA Europe Under-18 Championship, bronze at the 2014 FIBA Europe Under-18 Championship and silver at the 2015 FIBA Under-19 World Championship.

He coached Zadar during the 2012–13 season, then again during the 2014–15 and 2015–16 season.

On 30 November 2016, he was named head coach of MZT Skopje Aerodrom. He helped the team avoid relegation from the ABA League and win the Macedonian League title which was his first club trophy.

On 13 November 2017, he was named head coach of Cibona. At the end of the season in which Cibona lost in the finals of the national cup and championship from their city rivals Cedevita, in June 2018 Nazor and Cibona failed to renew their contract.

On 24 October 2018, he became head coach of Zadar for the third time in his career. After a fairly successful season in which the club avoided relegation from the ABA League First Division and made it the semi-finals of the 2018–19 Croatian League and 2019 Croatian Cup, in June 2019 Nazor signed a new two-year contract with Zadar. On 19 October 2019, he was sacked by the club following the series of poor performance in the opening of the new ABA League season (0–3).

In January 2020, Nazor signed for ZTE of the Hungarian League as head coach. After a series of bad results, in December 2020, Nazor left ZTE.

On 28 June 2021, Nazor was appointed head coach of KB Prishtina of the Kosovo Basketball Superleague.

References

External links
 Eurocup Profile
 Eurobasket Profile

1978 births
Living people
Croatian basketball coaches
KK Cibona coaches
KK Split coaches
KK Zadar coaches
Sportspeople from Split, Croatia